Hung Fa Chai is a hill in the New Territories of Hong Kong. On old Colonial maps of Hong Kong, it was marked as Ben Nevis, after the highest mountain in Scotland. It is the most northerly of all Hong Kong's hills over  featured in the list of mountains, peaks and hills in Hong Kong.

Hung Fa Chai has the same 'red flower' root as Robin's Nest while Chai can mean either 'stockaded village', 'camp' or 'mountain stronghold'.

See also 

 Robin's Nest

References 

Mountains, peaks and hills of Hong Kong
Sha Tau Kok
Closed Area